Paul Poulter is a racing driver. He has raced the #74 pickup since 2005 in the UK Pickup Truck Racing series. In 2008, he signed a contract to drive the #40 Chevrolet Silverado in the Craftsman Truck Series for Key Motorsports, making his debut on 20 June 2008 at the Milwaukee Mile.

Poulter was the Pickup Truck Racing Rockingham Superspeedway Champion and Rookie Champion in 2005, with a total of eight race wins. He is also a past multiple World, European and British Superstox champion.

Career history

2008 Pickup Truck Racing Championship, NASCAR Craftsman Truck Series
2007 Pickup Truck Racing Championship
2006 Pickup Truck Racing Championship
2005 Pickup Truck Racing Championship

Pre Pickups

2004 Superstox – World & British Champion
1996 Pickup Truck Racing – race winner at Baarlo
1996 Eurocar V6 – race winner at Mallory Park
1995 Superstox – European & British Champion
1984 Started racing Ministox

References

1973 births
English racing drivers
Living people
NASCAR drivers
ASCAR drivers